Quanyechang Subdistrict is a subdistrict located within Heping District, Tianjin. it shares border with Guangfudao Subdistrict in its north, Xiaobailou Subdistrict in its east, Nanyingmen Subdistrict in its south, as well as Xingnan and Nanshi Subdistricts in its west. In 2010, it had a total population of 59,551.

The subdistrict was named after Quanyechang Shopping Center, which has been operating continuously since 1928.

History

Administrative divisions 
In 2021, Quanyechang Subdistrict consisted of 12 communities.They are, by the order of their Administrative Division Codes:

Gallery

References 

Township-level divisions of Tianjin

Heping District, Tianjin